Warren Arthur Bebbington  (born 25 April 1952) was the 20th Vice Chancellor of the University of Adelaide. He was previously the Deputy Vice Chancellor (University Affairs) at the University of Melbourne. He commenced his position at the University of Adelaide in July 2012, and retired in April 2017.

Career 
Bebbington is a Fulbright Scholar, and holds master's degrees in arts, music and philosophy and a PhD. He studied at the University of Melbourne and at Queens College, Columbia University, and the City University of New York Graduate School. He worked as a teacher and was honored for his efforts as a recipient of the University of Melbourne Award for Excellence in Teaching (Humanities) in 2005 and an Australian Learning and Teaching Council Citation for "30 years of outstanding teaching" in 2008. His teaching appointments included the Australian National University's School of Music.

He is a published author of works on music, and was the music member on the international advisory committee for the Encyclopædia Britannica for over a decade.

Academia 
As his career progressed, Bebbington moved into leadership positions within academia. He served as a Dean at both the University of Melbourne and University of Queensland. He was appointed Deputy Vice-Chancellor (University Affairs) and later Pro-Vice Chancellor of the University of Melbourne prior to his appointment as Vice Chancellor of the University of Adelaide (2012–2017). At Adelaide, he was succeeded as Vice-Chancellor by Mike Brooks in the interim, and later by Peter Rathjen, the former Vice Chancellor of the University of Tasmania and Dean of Science at the University of Melbourne.

References 

Vice-Chancellors of the University of Adelaide
Living people
1952 births
University of Melbourne alumni
Columbia University alumni
City University of New York alumni
Members of the Order of Australia